Max Mirnyi was the defending champion but lost in the semifinals to Juan Carlos Ferrero.

Lleyton Hewitt won in the final 6–7(1–7), 7–5, 6–4 against Ferrero.

Seeds
A champion seed is indicated in bold text while text in italics indicates the round in which that seed was eliminated.

  Roger Federer (quarterfinals)
  Juan Carlos Ferrero (final)
  Rainer Schüttler (quarterfinals)
  Paradorn Srichaphan (first round)
  Tim Henman (semifinals)
  Lleyton Hewitt (champion)
  Sjeng Schalken (second round)
  Martin Verkerk (first round)

Draw

References
 2004 ABN AMRO World Tennis Tournament Singles Main Draw

2004 ABN AMRO World Tennis Tournament
Singles